Numrug (Cover) is a sum of Zavkhan Province in western Mongolia. In 2005, its population was 1,848.

References

Districts of Zavkhan Province